Campiglossa saltoria is a species of fruit fly in the family Tephritidae.

Distribution
The species is found in Kenya, Tanzania.

References

Tephritinae
Insects described in 1951
Diptera of Africa